Mirjapur may refer to:

Mirjapur, Janakpur, Nepal
Mirjapur, Narayani, Nepal